Necessary Angels is the third album by the American singer-songwriter Sara Hickman, released in 1994 (see 1994 in music).

After Hickman was dropped by her label, Elektra Records, her fans contributed to allow her to buy back the unreleased tapes that made up the album.

Critical reception
AllMusic called the album Hickman's "boldest, most mature, and most musically sophisticated offering to date." New York called it an "enormously rich album." Billboard wrote that Hickman "eschews some of her earlier wordplay for lyrics that are cleaner and sharper ... Lovely."

Track listing
"Pursuit of Happiness" (Hickman) – 4:55
"Shadowboxing" (Hickman) – 4:24
"The Best of Times" (Hickman) – 4:41
"Sister and Sam" (Hickman) – 5:33
"Time Will Tell" (Hickman) – 1:59
"Eye of the Storm" (Hickman) – 6:15
"Oh, Daddy" (Hickman, David Batteau) – 4:24
"Room of One's Own" (Hickman, Gerald O'Brien) – 5:26
"Tiger in a Teacup Town" (Hickman) – 4:32
"Slippery" (Hickman) – 4:10
"Joy" (Hickman) – 5:23
"The Place Where the Garage Used to Stand" (Hickman) – 4:06

Personnel
Sara Hickman – acoustic guitar, flute, guitar, percussion, electric guitar, vocals, background vocals, choir, harmony vocals
Amy Atchley – choir
David Batteau – guitar, background vocals
Adrian Belew – acoustic guitar, guitar, mandolin, calliope, electric guitar, background vocals
Jim Cocke – organ, keyboards
Mike Daane – bass guitar
Carl Finch – accordion
Glenn Fukunaga – bass guitar
Rafael Gayol – drums
Mark Hallman – percussion, background vocals, choir, shaker, tambo drums
Ethridge Hill – trumpet
Bradley Kopp – electric guitar
Danny Levin – cello
Tony Levin – bass guitar
Mitch Marine – drums
Jerry Marotta – percussion, drums 
Darcy Matthews – background vocals, choir
Dominic Matthews – choir
Genevieve Matthews – choir
Ian Matthews – choir
Kris McKay – choir
Brad McLemore – electric guitar
Pamela Miller – choir
Paul Pearcy – percussion, drums
Pierce Pettis – acoustic guitar
Mark Rubin – upright bass
David Sancious – piano, keyboards
Chris Searles – percussion, sound effects, tambourine, noise
Tommy Taylor (musician) – drums
Richard Weiss – choir
Morgan Wommack – choir
Brad Young – background vocals

Production
Producers: Sara Hickman, Paul Fox, Mark Hallman
Engineers: Mark Hallman, Marty Lester, Kevin Smith, Ed Thacker
Assistant engineers: Marty Lester, Allan Queen, Mike Reiter,
Arranger: Sara Hickman, Paul Fox
String arrangements: Sara Hickman, Danny Levin
Mixing: Sara Hickman, Mark Hallman, Marty Lester, Kevin Smith, Ed Thacker
Remixing: Sara Hickman, Mark Hallman, Marty Lester, Kevin Smith
Mastering: Joe Gastwirt
Art direction: Sara Hickman
Illustrations: Sara Hickman
Photography: Lynn Sugarman
Hair stylist: Tony Fielding
Make-up: Tony Fielding
Clothing/wardrobe: Cyndy Goodman

References

Sara Hickman albums
1994 albums
Albums produced by Paul Fox (record producer)
Discovery Records albums